Mikhail Kopelman is a Russian-American violinist.

He was born in 1947 in Uzhhorod and studied at the Moscow Conservatory with professors Maya Glezarova and Yuri Yankelevich. In 1973, he was awarded 2nd prize in the Long-Thibaud-Crespin Competition.

He was a member of the Bolshoi Theatre Orchestra, and was a concertmaster of the Moscow Philharmonic Orchestra. He played first violin in the Borodin Quartet for 20 years starting in 1976. He played first violin in the Tokyo String Quartet.

Kopelman taught at the Moscow Conservatory from 1980 to 1993. He emigrated to the United States with his family in 1993. He currently is a first violin in the Kopelman Quartet, and a Professor of Violin at the Eastman School of Music, (Rochester, New York).

References

External links
Biography

1947 births
Living people
Musicians from Uzhhorod
Russian classical violinists
American classical violinists
Male classical violinists
American male violinists
Jewish classical violinists
Yale School of Music faculty
Eastman School of Music faculty
Russian emigrants to the United States
21st-century classical violinists
21st-century American male musicians
Jewish Ukrainian musicians
Ukrainian Jews
21st-century American violinists